Geoff Evans (born 28 April 1939) was an English cricketer. He was a right-handed batsman and wicket-keeper who played for Devon. He was born in Exeter.

Evans, who represented the side in the Minor Counties Championship between 1978 and 1980, made a single List A appearance for the side, during the 1978 Gillette Cup, against Staffordshire. From the tailend, he scored 2 not out.

External links
Geoff Evans at Cricket Archive 

1939 births
Living people
English cricketers
Devon cricketers
Wicket-keepers